Murodermin (INN), also known as recombinant murine epidermal growth factor (rmEGF), is a recombinant form of mouse epidermal growth factor (EGF) and an EGF receptor agonist which was never marketed.

See also
 Nepidermin

References

Growth factors
Recombinant proteins